Arthur Turner was a manager of English football club Norwich City.

Turner was City's third manager, and was in charge for 86 matches between 1909 and 1910, winning 27, losing 37 and drawing 22 games.

References 

English football managers
Norwich City F.C. managers
Year of death missing
Year of birth missing